Çarşıbaşı Arena is an indoor handball venue located in Çarşıbaşı town of Trabzon Province, Turkey. The arena has a capacity of 500 spectators.

The arena hosted the handball event for boys during the 2011 European Youth Summer Olympic Festival.

References

Sports venues in Trabzon
Handball venues in Turkey